Bohlen may refer to:

 Bohlen, a surname
 Böhlen, a town in Saxony, Germany
 Böhlen, Thuringia, a municipality in Thuringia, Germany
 D.A. Bohlen & Son, architectural firm in Indianapolis, Indiana